16 Camelopardalis is a single star in the northern circumpolar constellation Camelopardalis, located 348 light years away from the Sun as determined from parallax measurements. It is visible to the naked eye as a faint, white-hued star with an apparent visual magnitude of 5.28. This object is moving further from the Earth with a heliocentric radial velocity of around 12 km/s.

This is an A-type main-sequence star with a stellar classification of A0 Vn, where the 'n' notation indicates "nebulous" lines due to rapid rotation. In the past it was misidentified as a Lambda Boötis star. It is around 400 million years old and is spinning with a projected rotational velocity of 217 km/s. The star has 2.8 times the mass of the Sun and 3.3 times the Sun's radius. It is radiating 97 times the Sun's luminosity from its photosphere at an effective temperature of 9,748 K. 

An infrared excess indicates it has a dusty debris disk with a mean temperature of 120 K orbiting at a distance of 52 AU from the star. This disk has a combined mass equal to 2.1% the mass of the Earth.

References

External links
 HR 1751
 Image 16 Camelopardalis
 CCDM J05234+5732

A-type main-sequence stars
Camelopardalis (constellation)
Durchmusterung objects
Camelopardalis,16
034787
025197
1751